The Continental Final was a Motorcycle speedway Final sanctioned by the FIM as the qualifying round for the Speedway World Championship between 1976 and 2000.

From 1952-1975 it acted as the final qualifier for the Championship Round or European Final but from 1976-1990 it was upgraded in stature and acted as a final qualifier for the World Championship Final itself. It was not held from 1991-1994 and then from 1995-2001 it acted as a final qualifier for the Speedway Grand Prix or Grand Prix Challenge.

Editions

See also
 Speedway World Championship
 Speedway Grand Prix
 Motorcycle speedway

References

Recurring sporting events established in 1953